The 2019–20 1. FC Heidenheim season was the 6th consecutive season in the 2. Bundesliga, the second division of German football, played by 1. FC Heidenheim, a football club based in Heidenheim an der Brenz, Baden-Württemberg, Germany. In addition to the 2. Bundesliga, Heidenheim also participated in the DFB-Pokal. The club played their home matches at the Voith-Arena.

Season summary

Players

First-team squad

Left club during season

Transfers

Transfers in

Loans in

Transfers out

Loans out

Friendly matches

Competitions

Overview

Bundesliga

League table

Results summary

Results by round

Matches

Relegation play-offs
As a result of their third place finish in the regular season, the club qualified for the play-off match with the 16th-place team in the 2019–20 Bundesliga to determine whether the club would be promoted to the 2020–21 Bundesliga.

DFB-Pokal

Player statistics

Appearances and goals

Notes

References

External links

1. FC Heidenheim seasons
1. FC Heidenheim